Snatch (stylized as snatch.) is a 2000 British-American crime comedy film written and directed by Guy Ritchie, featuring an ensemble cast. Set in the London criminal underworld, the film contains two intertwined plots: one dealing with the search for a stolen diamond, the other with a small-time boxing promoter (Jason Statham) who finds himself under the thumb of a ruthless gangster (Alan Ford) who is ready and willing to have his subordinates carry out severe and sadistic acts of violence.

The film features an assortment of characters, including Irish Traveller "One Punch" Mickey O'Neil (Brad Pitt), referred to as a "Pikey", Russian arms-dealer Boris "the Blade" Yurinov (Rade Šerbedžija), professional thief and gambling addict Franky "Four-Fingers" (Benicio del Toro), American gangster-jeweller Abraham Denovitz known as "Cousin Avi" (Dennis Farina), small-time crooks Sol (Lennie James) and Vinny (Robbie Gee), getaway driver Tyrone (Ade), and bounty hunter Bullet-Tooth Tony (Vinnie Jones). It is also distinguished by a kinetic direction and editing style, an intricate double plot featuring numerous ironic twists of chance and causality, and a fast pace.

The film shares themes, ideas, and motifs with Ritchie's first film, Lock, Stock and Two Smoking Barrels. It is also filmed in the same visual style and features many of the same actors, including Vinnie Jones, Jason Statham, Jason Flemyng, and Alan Ford.

Plot
After stealing an  diamond while dressed as an ultra-Orthodox Jew during a heist in Antwerp, Franky "Four-Fingers" goes to London to see diamond dealer Doug "The Head" on behalf of New York jeweler and Jewish-American organized crime figure "Cousin Avi". One of the other robbers advises Franky to obtain a gun from his brother, arms dealer and ex-KGB agent Boris "The Blade", then later calls Boris and encourages him to steal the diamond from Franky before he can turn it over to Doug.

Meanwhile, Cockney boxing promoter and slot machine shop owner Turkish is persuaded by crime boss "Brick Top" to put his boxer "Gorgeous George" in a match against one of Brick Top's boxers. However, when Turkish sends his partner Tommy and Gorgeous George to purchase a caravan from a clan of Irish Travellers, George gets challenged to a fistfight against Traveller bare-knuckle boxing champion Mickey O'Neil, who beats up and severely injures George. Turkish persuades Mickey to replace George in his upcoming match by agreeing to purchase a new caravan for Mickey's mother. Brick Top grudgingly agrees, but only on the condition that Mickey will throw the fight in the fourth round.

Boris gives Franky a revolver in exchange for a favour: Franky is to place a bet on Boris' behalf at Brick Top's bookies. Avi, knowing Franky has gambling addiction, flies to London with his bodyguard "Rosebud" to pick up the diamond personally. Boris hires Vinny and Sol, two pawnbrokers and small-time crooks, to rob Franky while he is at the bookies. The robbery goes awry when they crash their car into Franky's van while trying to park, trapping Franky inside. Sol, Vinny, and their getaway driver Tyrone are caught on camera and find no money at the bookies due to the bets being cancelled since Gorgeous George had to drop out, but manage to kidnap Franky in their escape. At their pawn shop, Sol and Vinny hold Franky captive with a sack over his head. Upon Boris' arrival, Sol and Vinny demand he gives them half of the cash when he sells the diamond, during which Vinny utters Boris' name. Realizing that his identity and betrayal has been exposed to Franky, Boris kills Franky by shooting him in the head, and leaves with the diamond.

Instead of throwing the fight, Mickey accidentally knocks his opponent out with a single punch due to his overwhelming power. Infuriated, Brick Top robs Turkish of his life savings and demands that Mickey fight again, and lose since the majority of the gamblers will now bet on him. Mickey refuses to fight again unless Turkish buys an even better caravan for his mother, but Turkish has no money left since Brick Top stole his savings. Furious, Brick Top has his men vandalize Turkish's gambling arcade and burn down Mickey's mother's caravan while she is asleep inside. Brick Top and his men then track down Tyrone, Sol, and Vinny to kill them for robbing his bookies. Sol bargains for their lives by offering Brick Top the stolen diamond, and is given 48 hours to retrieve it.

Avi and Doug hire "Bullet-Tooth" Tony to help them find Franky. When the trail leads to Boris, they kidnap him and retrieve the diamond, while being closely pursued by Sol, Vinny, and Tyrone. Turkish and Tommy, who are on their way to purchase a gun from Boris, are driving on the same stretch of road at the time. When Tommy throws Turkish's carton of milk out of their car window, it splashes over Tony's windscreen, causing him to crash which accidentally kills Rosebud in the process. Boris escapes from the wreck only to be hit by Tyrone's car. Tony and Avi are confronted by Sol, Vinny, and Tyrone at a pub where Tony realizes that the trio's pistols are replicas, which he contrasts with his real handgun, intimidating them into leaving. The wounded Boris arrives with an assault rifle and a grenade launcher looking for the diamond, but is shot and killed by Tony, who wounds Tyrone at the same time. Sol and Vinny leave a wounded Tyrone and escape with the diamond, which Vinny hides in his pants. When Tony catches up to them, they tell him that the diamond is back at their pawn shop. Once there, Vinny pretends to have misplaced the diamond, then accuses his dog, which he got earlier from the Irish Traveller clan, of eating it. When Avi tells Tony to kill the dog, Vinny gives in and produces the diamond from his pants, but the dog snatches the diamond away and runs off, presumably back to the Irish Travellers' campsite. Avi wildly fires at the fleeing dog, accidentally killing Tony. He gives up and returns to New York City.

Mickey agrees to fight to avoid more carnage, but gets so drunk after his mother's wake that Turkish fears he will not make it to the fourth round. If he fails to go down in the fourth round as agreed, Brick Top vows that his men will murder Turkish, Tommy, Mickey, and his entire clan of Travellers.

At the fight, Mickey makes it to the fourth round as per Brick Top's plan, and gets knocked down by his opponent. But at the last moment, Mickey recovers and knocks out his opponent with one punch, much to the chagrin of Turkish, Tommy and Brick Top. Outside the arena, as Tommy, Turkish, and Mickey try to run for their lives, Brick Top and his men are ambushed and killed by the Travellers. It is revealed that this has all been planned out by Mickey to avenge his mother. In fact, Mickey purposely did not go down during the fight as he had secretly bet on himself to win.

The next morning, Turkish and Tommy find the Travellers' campsite deserted as Mickey and "the pikeys" have escaped with their winnings. When confronted by the police, they cannot explain why they are there, until Vinny's dog suddenly appears and they claim to be walking it. On their way back, they cross paths with Sol and Vinny, who are discovered and being put under arrest by the police for hiding Franky and Tony's bodies in the boot of their car. Sol and Vinny watch in defeat as Turkish and Tommy drive away with the dog (and the diamond).

Turkish and Tommy take the dog to a veterinarian to extract a squeaky toy that it had swallowed, and consequently discover the diamond in its stomach. They consult Doug about selling the diamond and he calls Avi, who returns to London to purchase it.

Cast

 Jason Statham as Turkish
 Stephen Graham as Tommy
 Dennis Farina as Abraham "Cousin Avi" Denovitz
 Brad Pitt as Mickey O’Neil
 Alan Ford as "Brick Top" Pulford
 Robbie Gee as "Vinny" Vincent
 Lennie James as "Sol" Solomon
 Benicio del Toro as Franky Four-Fingers
 Ade as Tyrone, the 'Getaway Driver'
 Rade Šerbedžija as Boris "The Blade" Yurinov
 Vinnie Jones as Bullet Tooth Tony
 Adam Fogerty as Gorgeous George
 Mike Reid as Douglas "Doug The Head" Denovitz
 Nicola and Teena Collins as Alex and Susi
 Sorcha Cusack as Mrs O'Neil
 Jason Flemyng as Darren
 Goldie as Bad Boy Lincoln
 Velibor Topić as The Russian
 Sam Douglas as Rosebud
 Ewen Bremner as Mullet
 Andy Beckwith as Errol
 Dave Legeno as John
 William Beck as Neil

Production
Principal photography for Snatch was filmed between October 18 and December 12, 1999 in London and Buckinghamshire. A half-hour documentary of the production of the film was released featuring much of the cast along with Ritchie.

Reception

Box office
Snatch was largely successful, both in critical response and financial gross, and has gone on to develop a devoted cult following. From a budget of $10 million, the film grossed £12,137,698 in the United Kingdom, $30.3 million in the United States and Canada, and a total of $83.6 million worldwide.

Critical response
On review aggregator Rotten Tomatoes, the film has an approval rating of 74%, based on 142 reviews, with a weighted average score of 6.40/10. The site's critical consensus reads, "Though perhaps a case of style over substance, Guy Ritchie's second crime caper is full of snappy dialogue, dark comedy, and interesting characters." On Metacritic, the film has a score 55 out of 100, based on 31 critics, indicating "mixed or average reviews". Audiences polled by CinemaScore gave the film an average grade of "B" on an A+ to F scale.

While the film received mostly positive reviews, several reviewers commented negatively on perceived similarities in plot, character, setting, theme and style between Snatch and Ritchie's previous work, Lock, Stock and Two Smoking Barrels. In his review, Roger Ebert gave the film 2 out of 4 stars, writing that while ostensibly rooted in the London underworld, Pitt's Irish traveller community were the most interesting element of the plot and the film's clearest predecessors were all American: Dick Tracy comics, Damon Runyon stories, and zany Marx Brothers comedies. He raised the question of "What am I to say of Snatch, Ritchie's new film, which follows the 'Lock, Stock' formula so slavishly it could be like a new arrangement of the same song?" Writing in the New York Times Elvis Mitchell commented that "Mr. Ritchie seems to be stepping backward when he should be moving ahead". Some critics also argued that the film was lacking in depth and substance; many reviewers appeared to agree with Ebert's comment that "the movie is not boring, but it doesn't build and it doesn't arrive anywhere".
The film has gone on to develop a cult movie following, and features within the IMDb top 250 rated films.

Soundtrack

Two versions of the soundtrack album were released, one on the Universal International label with 23 tracks and a TVT Records release with 20.

Track listing
"Diamond" – Klint
"Vere Iz da Storn?" – Benicio del Toro
"Supermoves" – Overseer
"Hernando's Hideaway" – The Johnston Brothers
"Zee Germans" – Jason Statham
"Golden Brown" – The Stranglers
"Dreadlock Holiday" – 10cc
"Hava Nagila" – John Murphy and Daniel L. Griffiths
"Avi Arrives" – Dennis Farina
"Cross the Track (We Better Go Back)" – Maceo & the Macks
"Disco Science" – Mirwais
"Nemesis" – Alan Ford
"Hot Pants (I'm Coming, Coming, I'm Coming)" – Bobby Byrd
"Lucky Star" – Madonna
"Come Again!" – Alan Ford
"Ghost Town" – The Specials
"Shrinking Balls" – Vinnie Jones
"Sensual Woman" – The Herbaliser
"Angel" – Massive Attack
"RRRR...Rumble" – Charles Cork
"Fuckin' in the Bushes" – Oasis
"Avi's Declaration" – Dennis Farina
"Don't You Just Know It" – Huey "Piano" Smith & the Clowns

Home media
The film has been released in multiple incarnations on DVD and other formats.

On 3 July 2001, a two-disc "Special Edition" was released, containing both a full screen and widescreen presentation of the feature. Also included was an audio commentary track with director Guy Ritchie and producer Matthew Vaughn. The special features on the second disc included a "making of" featurette, deleted scenes, original theatrical trailer and TV spots, text/photo galleries, storyboard comparisons, and filmographies.

On 17 September 2002, Columbia TriStar Home Entertainment released a "Deluxe Collection" DVD as part of the company's Superbit series. This release contained two discs, one being the special features disc of the original DVD release, and the other a superbit version of the feature. As is the case with superbit presentations, the disc was absent of the additional features included in the original standard DVD, such as the audio commentary. (The disc did still contain subtitles in eight different languages including a "pikey" track, which only showed subtitles for the character Mickey.)

Nine months later, on 3 June 2003, a single disc setup was released, with new cover art, containing the feature disc of the special edition set. This version was simply a repackaging, omitting the second disc.

On July 13th 2021, Sony Pictures released Snatch on the 4k Ultra HD format, which features an HDR transfer of the film along with the special features of the previously released Blu-Ray.

Television

On 20 April 2016, Crackle announced that the go-ahead for a new television series, based on the film, had been agreed. On 22 August  it was confirmed that Rupert Grint would both be executive producer and would star in the show. The series debuted on 16 March 2017 and had two seasons.

See also
 Hyperlink cinema – the film style of using multiple inter-connected story lines
 Irish Travellers
 Shelta
Heist film

Notes

External links

  (archived)

2000 films
2000 crime films
2000s crime comedy films
2000s heist films
British crime comedy films
British gangster films
British heist films
Films directed by Guy Ritchie
Films scored by John Murphy (composer)
Films set in Antwerp
Films set in London
Screen Gems films
Works about Irish Travellers
Films produced by Matthew Vaughn
Hyperlink films
Films with screenplays by Guy Ritchie
British boxing films
2000 comedy films
2000s English-language films
2000s British films